Aleksander Kowalski (20 July 1930 – February 2009) was a Polish skier. He competed in the Nordic combined event at the 1956 Winter Olympics.

References

External links
 

1930 births
2009 deaths
Polish male Nordic combined skiers
Olympic Nordic combined skiers of Poland
Nordic combined skiers at the 1956 Winter Olympics
Sportspeople from Zakopane
20th-century Polish people